This is a list of some of the breeds of horse considered in Italy to be wholly or partly of Italian origin. Some may have complex or obscure histories, so inclusion here does not necessarily imply that a breed is predominantly or exclusively Italian.

 Anglo-Arabo Sardo
 Appeninico
 Avelignese or Haflinger
 Bardigiano
 Calabrese
 Catria horse
 Cavallo Romano della Maremma Laziale
 Esperia Pony
 Giara horse
 Italian Trotter
 Lipizzano
 Maremmano
 Monterufolino
 Murgese
 Napoletano
 Norico
 Pentro horse
 Persano
 Purosangue Orientale
 Salernitano
 Samolaco horse
 Sanfratellano
 Sarcidano
 Sardinian Anglo-Arab
 Sella Italiano
 Siciliano indigeno
 Tolfetano
 TPR or Cavallo italiano da tiro pesante rapido
 Ventasso horse

References

 
Horse